Guadalupe Buye Peña (born March 17, 1962) is a Mexican former luchadora, or female professional wrestler who was primarily active from 1976 until 1996. She worked under the ring name La Sirenita, Spanish for "Little Mermaid". She was once married to a professional wrestler known as "Crazy 33" and together they have a son that also became a professional wrestler under the name Enigma.

During her career, Buye won several championships, including the Distrito Federal Women's Championship, the Mexican National Women's Championship on two occasions, and the Mexican National Women's Tag Team Championship alongside La Rosa. She started her career as an enmascarada, or masked wrestler but lost her mermaid inspired mask to Viuda Negra I in 1984. She stopped working full time in 1996, having only wrestled on special occasions since then, with matches in 2007, 2010, 2012 and 2017.

Championships and accomplishments
Empresa Mexicana de Lucha Libre'
Mexican National Women's Championship (2 times)
Comision de Box y Lucha D.F.
Distrito Federal Women's Championship (1 time)
Mexican National Women's Tag Team Championship (1 time  with La Rosa

Luchas de Apuestas record

References

1959 births
Living people
Mexican female professional wrestlers